Muhd Asri bin Muhamad (born 2 October 1998) is a Malaysian professional footballer who plays as a goalkeeper for PDRM.

References

External links
 

1998 births
Living people
People from Kedah
Malaysian footballers
Malaysia Super League players
Malaysia Premier League players
PDRM FA players
Kedah Darul Aman F.C. players
Association football goalkeepers
Malaysian people of Malay descent